Diletta is an Italian female given name. Notable people with the name include:

Diletta Leotta (born 1991), Italian television presenter
Diletta Rizzo Marin, Italian operatic mezzo-soprano
Diletta Carli (born 1996), Italian swimmer
Diletta Giampiccolo (born 1974), amateur Italian freestyle wrestler

References

Italian feminine given names